Petro Vasylovych Balabuyev (23 March 1931 in Valuisk, Luhansk Oblast, Ukrainian SSR – 17 May 2007) was a Ukrainian aircraft designer, engineer, Doctor of Engineering (1988), professor, chief designer of the Antonov Design Bureau (1984 – May 2005), Hero of Socialist Labour and a Hero of Ukraine, head of Kyiv-based Antonov Aircraft for 20 years.

Biography 
Petro Balabuyev was born on 23 May 1931, on a Valuysk farm in the Luhansk region. He graduated from the Kharkov Aviation Institute in 1954 with qualifications of an aircraft mechanical engineer.
In April 1954, after graduating from Kharkiv Aviation Institute, he started working at the Kharkov aircraft company:
 at first as a structural engineer
 since 1956 - Head of the workshop 
 since 1959 - Head of the assembly line
 since 1960 - lead designer, acting head of production dept.
 since 1961 - deputy chief engineer, main representative of Antonov Design Bureau at Tashkent Aviation Production Association
 since 1965 - Head of the Research Bureau of Antonov
 since 1968 - deputy chief designer
 since 1971 - chief designer, First Deputy General Designer
 since 1984 - chief designer of Antonov

Aircraft 
Under his guidance the following aircraft were developed: Antonov An-22, Antonov An-72, An-74, Antonov An-32, Antonov An-28, Antonov An-124 (the world's second largest serially manufactured cargo aircraft), Antonov An-225 Mriya (eng. - Dream) (the largest operational aircraft in the world - destroyed after Russian attack). Among recent developments are the Antonov An-140 and Antonov An-148, Antonov An-38 and Antonov An-70.

Other positions taken by Petro Balabuyev:

 Chairman of the board of the International Consortium "Medium Transport Aircraft" 
 Program manager for the implementation of the contract with the Islamic Republic of Iran
 Member of Exporter council at the Cabinet of Ministers of Ukraine (since February 1999)

Balabuyev was the author of over 100 scientific papers. He developed scientific bases of design and practical implementation of supercritical wing profiles into the design of heavy transport aircraft.

Petro Balabuyev died on May 17, 2007, in Kyiv.

Awards and honours

Soviet and Russian 

 Order of the Red Banner of Labour (1966)
 USSR State Prize (1973)
 Hero of Socialist Labour (awarded with Order of Lenin and the Gold Medal "Hammer and Sickle", 1975)
 Order of Friendship (1998)

Ukrainian 

 Shevchenko National Prize (1979)
 Honoured master of sciences and engineering (1991)
 Order of Merit, II grade (1997) and 1 grade (1998)
 Honorary citizen of Kyiv (May 1998)
 Hero of Ukraine 
 Diploma of the Cabinet of Ministers of Ukraine (2001)
 Order of Prince Yaroslav the Wise, V grade (2001)

In 2001, he was awarded the Edward Warner Award.

References

 
 

1931 births
2007 deaths
People from Stanytsia-Luhanska Raion
National Aerospace University – Kharkiv Aviation Institute alumni
Heroes of Socialist Labour
Recipients of the Order of Lenin
Recipients of the Order of Merit (Ukraine), 1st class
Recipients of the Order of Merit (Ukraine), 2nd class
Recipients of the Order of Prince Yaroslav the Wise, 5th class
Recipients of the Order of the Red Banner of Labour
Recipients of the Order of State
Recipients of the USSR State Prize
Eleventh convocation members of the Verkhovna Rada of the Ukrainian Soviet Socialist Republic
Aircraft designers
20th-century Ukrainian engineers
Soviet engineers
Recipients of the Honorary Diploma of the Cabinet of Ministers of Ukraine